Sir John Linton Myres OBE FBA FRAI (3 July 1869 in Preston – 6 March 1954 in Oxford) was a British archaeologist and academic, who conducted excavations in Cyprus in the late 19th and early 20th centuries.

Life
He was the son of the Rev. William Miles Myres and his wife, Jane Linton, and was educated at Winchester College. He graduated B.A. at New College, Oxford in 1892. At the same year he was a Craven Fellow at the British School at Athens with which he excavated at the Minoan sanctuary of Petsofas. Myres became the first Wykeham Professor of Ancient History, at the University of Oxford, in 1910, having been Gladstone Professor of Greek and Lecturer in Ancient Geography, University of Liverpool from 1907. He contributed to the British Naval Intelligence Division Geographical Handbook Series that was published during the Second World War, and to the noted 11th edition of the Encyclopædia Britannica (1910–1911).

Myers was also a member of the Folklore Society and served as its President between 1924 and 1926. Later he became president of the Royal Anthropological Institute between 1928 and 1931. And finally president of the Hellenic Society between 1935-1938. Additionally, he was the founder of the journal Man and its first editor from 1901-1903. 

His work in Cyprus spanned several decades, with the German archaeologist Max Ohnefalsch-Richter he published the first catalogue of the Cyprus Museum. In 1894 he participated in the excavations of the British Museum at Amathus, he also excavated for the British School at Athens, with the support of the Cyprus Exploration Fund, various sites such as the Bronze Age site of Ayia Paraskevi, Kalopsida, Laxia tou Riou and Kition. Myres gave his share of the finds to the University of Oxford where it forms the core of the Cypriot collection of the Ashmolean Museum . Myres Archive is located at the Ashmolean Museum. 

Additionally, he conducted excavations at Lapithos in 1913 with Leonard Halford Dudley Buxton. Furthermore, in 1914, he published a handbook of the Cesnola collection in the Metropolitan Museum of Art. He was an advisor during the drafting of the 1935 Antiquities Law and the setting up of the Department of Antiquities.

According to Robert Ranulph Marett,

He was a major influence on the British-Australian archaeologist Vere Gordon Childe.

At Oxford, Myres worked for the Director of Naval Intelligence.

Works
 Excavations in Cyprus in 1894 (1897)
Copper and Bronze in Cyprus and South-East Europe (1898)
 A catalogue of the Cyprus museum, with a chronicle of excavations undertaken since the British occupation, and introductory notes on Cypriote archaeology (1899)
Notes on the History of the Kabyle Pottery (1902)
 Sarcophagus from Amathus, Sarcophagus from Golgi (1909-1911)
 The value of ancient history (1910)
 The Dawn of History (New York/London: Holt/Williams and Norgate, 1911)
 Herodotus : Outline Analysis of Books I-Vl (Oxford: Hart [printer], 1912).
 Handbook of the Cesnola collection of antiquities from Cyprus (1914)
Notes on the ‘Prison of Saint Catharine’ at Salamis in Cyprus (1915)
 The influence of anthropology on the course of political science (1916)
 The Political Ideas of the Greeks (1927)
 Who were the Greeks? (Berkeley: University of California Press, 1930), Sather Lectures 
The Early Pot-Fabrics of Asia Minor (1930)
 The Cretan Labyrinth: A Retrospect of Aegean Research (1933)
The Amathus Bowl: A Long-Lost Masterpiece of Oriental Engraving (1933)
A Modern 'Kernos' Vessel from Tiflis (1937)
A 'Kernos,' or Ring-Vase, in the Museum of Fine Arts, Boston, Massachusetts (1939)
 Excavations in Cyprus, 1913 (1940-1945)
Concentric Circle Ornament on Vessels of Wood from the Taurus (1952)
 Herodotus, Father of History (Oxford: Clarendon Press, 1953)

References

External links

 
Article on Myers at the Pitt Rivers Museum

1869 births
Writers from Preston, Lancashire
1954 deaths
British archaeologists
Wykeham Professors of Ancient History
Prehistorians
Victoria Medal recipients
Alumni of New College, Oxford
Presidents of the Folklore Society
Knights Bachelor
Fellows of the Royal Anthropological Institute of Great Britain and Ireland
Presidents of the Royal Anthropological Institute of Great Britain and Ireland